Tasmalira is a genus of very small sea snails, marine gastropod molluscs in the family Cerithiidae, the cerithids.

Species
Species within the genus Tasmalira include:
 Tasmalira vitrea (Suter, 1908)
Species brought into synonymy
 Tasmalira wellingtonensis Dell, 1956: synonym of Tasmalira vitrea (Suter, 1908)

References

Further reading 
 Powell A. W. B., New Zealand Mollusca, William Collins Publishers Ltd, Auckland, New Zealand 1979 

Cerithiidae